The 37th Annual TV Week Logie Awards was held on Friday 28 April 1995 at the Melbourne Concert Hall in Melbourne, and broadcast on the Seven Network. The ceremony was hosted by Andrew Daddo and Noni Hazelhurst. Guests included Dean Cain, Mark Curry, Holly Robinson and Big Bird.

Winners

Gold Logie
Most Popular Personality on Australian Television
Winner:
Ray Martin in A Current Affair (Nine Network)

Acting/Presenting

Most Popular Actor
Winner:
Dieter Brummer in Home and Away (Seven Network)

Most Popular Actress
Winner:
Melissa George in Home and Away (Seven Network)

Most Outstanding Actor
Winner:
Chris Haywood in Janus (ABC TV)

Most Outstanding Actress
Winner:
Monica Maughan in The Damnation of Harvey McHugh (ABC TV)

Most Popular Comedy Personality
Winner:
Daryl Somers in Hey Hey It's Saturday (Nine Network)

Most Popular Light Entertainment Personality
Winner:
Daryl Somers in Hey Hey It's Saturday (Nine Network)

Most Popular New Talent
Winner:
Lisa McCune in Blue Heelers (Seven Network)

Most Popular Programs

Most Popular Series
Winner:
Home and Away (Seven Network)

Most Popular Drama
Winner:
The Battlers (Seven Network)

Most Popular Light Entertainment Program
Winner:
Hey Hey It's Saturday (Nine Network)

Most Popular Comedy Program
Winner:
Full Frontal (Seven Network)

Most Popular Public Affairs Program
Winner:
A Current Affair (Nine Network)

Most Popular Lifestyle or Information Program
Winner:
Burke's Backyard (Nine Network)

Most Popular Sports Program
Winner:
1994 Commonwealth Games (Seven Network)

Most Popular Children's Program
Winner:
Agro's Cartoon Connection (Seven Network)

Most Outstanding Programs

Most Outstanding Achievement in Drama Production
Winner:
Janus (ABC TV)

Most Outstanding Achievement in Comedy
Winners:
Frontline (ABC TV)

Most Outstanding Achievement in News
Winner:
"Rwanda Refugee Crisis" (ABC TV)

Most Outstanding Achievement in Public Affairs
Winner:
"Inside a Holocaust", Four Corners (ABC TV)

Most Outstanding Achievement by a Regional Network
Winners:
Sandakan: The Untold Story (NBN)

Most Outstanding Documentary Single or Series
Winner:
Fifty Years of Silence (ABC TV)

Performers
Hot Taps
Alyssa-Jane Cook
Mental As Anything

Hall of Fame
After a lifetime in Australian television, Jack Thompson became the 12th inductee into the TV Week Logies Hall of Fame.

References

External links
 

1995
1995 television awards
1995 in Australian television